, also referred to as 666 or Triple Six, is a Japanese professional wrestling promotion based in Shinjuku, Tokyo, Japan. The promotion was founded in 2003 by Onryo and Qp-Crazy frontman .

History
On December 13, 2003, Onryo and The Crazy SKB co-produced a professional wrestling event in Tokyo that would become known as "666 vol. 1". The first events were mostly held at the Tokyo Battle Sphere until the promotion was banned from the venue that deemed their performances too extreme. Triple Six moved to the Differ Ariake arena which ended up also banning the promotion after The Crazy SKB destroyed equipment and broke into the Pro Wrestling Noah office. Today, the promotion holds most of its shows at the Shin-Kiba 1st Ring arena.

Triple Six also promotes three sub-brands: Shinjuku Ni-chōme Pro-Wrestling which began as a collaboration with the gay magazine Badi, Young Pro-Wrestling Wasshoi which features younger wrestlers, and Young Ribbon Wasshoi, a joint venture with women's wrestling promotion Ice Ribbon.

Succession of presidents
The Crazy SKB was considered the first president of the organization. Since his storyline disappearance, several wrestlers took over the presidency and adopted the title of "Crazy SKB".
 1st: The Crazy SKB
 2nd: 
 3rd: Tigers Mask
 4th: Senpai
 5th: 
 6th: 
 7th: 
 8th: Kana

Roster

Championships

Current championships

Inactive championships

Broadcaster
Niconico (2014–present)

See also

Professional wrestling in Japan
List of professional wrestling promotions in Japan

References

External links

Triple Six on Battle-News.com

Japanese professional wrestling promotions
2003 establishments in Japan
Shinjuku